Indian Meadows is an unincorporated community in Cabell County, West Virginia, United States.

References 

Unincorporated communities in West Virginia
Unincorporated communities in Cabell County, West Virginia